The 2012 Atlanta Silverbacks season will be the club's sixteenth season of existence, and their second consecutive season playing in the North American Soccer League (NASL), the second tier of the American soccer pyramid. The Silverbacks will be trying to rebound from the 2011 campaign that saw the club finish at the bottom of the regular season standings.

Background 

The 2011 season marked the Silverbacks return to American soccer following a two-year hiatus, that did not see the organization field a senior men's team throughout the 2009 and 2010 seasons.

The return season was arguably an abysmal campaign for the Silverbacks, as the club lost 20 of its 28 regular season matches, drawing and winning four matches apiece. During the regular season, the Silverbacks were mathematically eliminated from playoff contention with seven weeks left in the NASL regular season. José Manuel Abundis, then the head coach, was fired following the season replaced by then-assistant coach, Alex Pineda Chacón, whom played for the Silverbacks from 2003–04. The announcement came on November 7, 2011.

Review

Offseason 
On February 6, the Silverbacks released their preseason schedule, that involved matches against local college soccer and nearby NASL/USL Pro clubs.

Competitions

Preseason

NASL

Standings

Results summary

Results by round

Match results

U.S. Open Cup

Southern Derby

Statistics

Appearances and goals

Clean sheets

Disciplinary record

Transfers

In

Out

Loan in

Loan out

See also 
 2012 in American soccer
 2012 North American Soccer League season
 Atlanta Silverbacks

References 

2012
Atlanta Silverbacks
Atlanta Silverbacks
Atlanta Silverbacks